Patricia Silveyra (born January 20, 1981) is an Argentine-American lung physiologist and professor of Environmental Health at Indiana University School of Public Health. Her research interests include sex differences in innate immunity, lung disease, air pollution exposure effects, and mechanisms by which sex hormones control lung immunity.

Biography 

Silveyra was born and raised in Buenos Aires, Argentina. She attended the Escuela Superior de Comercio Carlos Pellegrini, one of the University of Buenos Aires's high schools. She later obtained a Licenciatura in Biological Sciences from the Facultad de Ciencias Exactas y Naturales, University of Buenos Aires, when she was only 21 years old. The first in her family to attend graduate school, Silveyra obtained her Doctor of Philosophy degree in Biological Chemistry from the University of Buenos Aires at age 26 after completing her doctoral thesis at the Instituto de Biología y Medicina Experimental and obtaining doctoral scholarships from the National Scientific and Technical Research Council and the Agencia Nacional de Promoción Científica y Tecnológica.

In 2008, Silveyra was the only Argentine selected as a Rotary International Ambassadorial Scholar, and moved to Hershey, Pennsylvania to conduct a postdoctoral training at Penn State College of Medicine. In 2013, she established her independent laboratory at Penn State College of Medicine, after receiving funding from Graduate Women in Science and the National Institutes of Health. Between 2015-2016, she served as Interim Director for Diversity and Inclusion in Education at Penn State College of Medicine. She was promoted to Associate Professor in 2018. From 2018-2020, she worked at the University of North Carolina at Chapel Hill as the Director of the Biobehavioral Laboratory and Beerstecher-Blackwell Distinguished term Associate Professor. In 2021, she moved to Indiana University Bloomington, where she is currently an Associate Professor of Environmental and Occupational Health, and was named a fellow of the American Thoracic Society. In 2022, Silveyra was named the inaugural Anthony D. Pantaleoni Eminent Scholar, an academic honor professors receive at Indiana University Bloomington School of Public Health. The same year, she was named interim chairperson for the Department of Environmental and Occupational Health.

Research contributions 
Silveyra's research interests center on the effect of environmental exposures —specifically inhaled air pollutants and allergens —on respiratory health and disease. Her group is working to understand how these exposures differentially affect males and females, an understudied area.

Her group is working to understand the contribution of male and female sex hormones in the development and progression of lung disease. Silveyra has edited and co-authored the first textbook on sex-based differences in lung physiology, in collaboration with the American Physiological Society. Silveyra's work has garnered support from a number of funding sources, including the National Institutes of Health.

Advocacy work 
An advocate for women and underrepresented scholars in science, Silveyra has served on the Board of Directors and as Treasurer of SACNAS, and is currently a co-Principal Investigator of a 5-year $8.6 million grant from the NIH that supports The National Diversity in STEM Conference.  

In 2018, Silveyra was selected an early career leader and co-chair of the inaugural cohort of the National Academies of Sciences, Engineering, and Medicine New Voices in Sciences, Engineering, and Medicine, an initiative designed to bring diverse perspectives from early-career U.S. leaders to important dialogues around how science, engineering, and medicine are shaping the global future. She was re-appointed as a member of the second cohort in 2021. Since 2020, she serves on the NASEM Board on Higher Education and Workforce.

Awards and honors 

 Adele Grant Lewis Fellowship, Graduate Women in Science, 2012
 Tribute to Women of Excellence Award, YWCA, 2016.
 “All In” at Penn State: An Achievement Award for Commitment to Diversity and Inclusion, Penn State University, 2017.
 Dale J. Benos Early Career Professional Service Award, American Physiological Society, 2017.
 New Voices in Science, Engineering, and Medicine, National Academy of Sciences, 2018.
 Outstanding Research + Professional Mentor, SACNAS, 2020.
 Fellow of the American Thoracic Society, 2021.
 Anthony D. Pantaleoni Eminent Scholar, 2022.

References

External links 

Living people
1981 births
Indiana University faculty
Scientists from Buenos Aires
Women biologists
Women physiologists
University of Buenos Aires alumni
21st-century women scientists